Blue Horse I is an oil painting by Franz Marc executed in 1911. It is one of the painter's most famous paintings and is part of the collection of the Städtische Galerie im Lenbachhaus in Munich. The painting was part of several exhibitions that fellow Russian painter Wassily Kandinsky and Franz Marc presented to the public under the name Der Blaue Reiter from late 1911 until 1914.

History
In 1911 Marc drew in his sketchbook no. XXIV a pencil drawing about the size of a postcard entitled Young Horse in Mountain Landscape, which already shows the composition of the later painting. In the same year he transcribed the sketch in great detail into a large oil painting.

The blue color stands in the color theory of Marc and the Der Blaue Reiter group for the spiritual principle. The paintings was initially not understood and was laughed at or even spat upon. It was part of the private collection of Bernhard Koehler, who supported Franz Marc financially and received paintings from the painter in return. He bequeathed his collection to his son, also named Bernhard, in 1927. After his death, the picture came to the Bernhard Koehler Foundation. In 1965 it was offered to the Städtische Galerie im Lenbachhaus and has been exhibited there since then. As a popular poster and postcard motif, it is now one of the most frequently reproduced paintings in recent art history.

Description

Almost the entire height of the portrait-format painting is taken up by a foal painted in blue, facing the viewer and tilting its head slightly to one side. The upper body is light blue with white spots, while the hooves and mane are painted in dark navy blue.

The landscape in which the foal is shown is dominated by strong contrasts of complementary colors, some of which are sharply demarcated from one another. The foreground is in vermilion and light green, strong dark green brushstrokes indicate vegetation. The hilly landscape in the background changes from carmine to yellow, violet and blue to orange at the top of the picture. and the blue color of the horse would also represent peace and a calm state of mind which he would have when he was drawing it.
Blue Horses in symbolically bound to certain of the originating conceptions of the contemporaneous Blue rider group: in the symbol of the horse as a vehicle of breakthrough, in the emphasis on the spirituality of blue, and in the idea of spirituality battling materialism.

Marc would use once again the motif of the blue horse in several paintings in the following years, from 1911 to 1914.

Honors
The Deutsche Post issued a stamp with the painting on 9 February 2012, in a edition meant to celebrate the 100th anniversary of Der Blaue Reiter.

See also
List of works by Franz Marc

References

External links
Blue Horse I, Städtische Galerie im Lenbachhaus (German)
 

1911 paintings
Horses in art
Paintings by Franz Marc
Paintings in the collection of the Lenbachhaus